Rahva Raamat is the largest retail and wholesale bookseller in Estonia. It has 12 bookstores and a restaurant in 8 cities and also sells to most other bookstores, supermarkets and libraries in Estonia.  Rahva Raamat in Viru Keskus was the winner in London Book Fair Bookstore of the Year award in 2022

Rahva Raamat has 5 locations in Tallinn, one in Tartu, Pärnu, Viljandi, Kuressaare, Rakvere, Narva and Jõhvi.

History 
Rahva Raamat was founded in 1912, when Estonian publisher Gustav Pihlakas opened his bookstore in Pärnu mnt 10, a newly designed house by respected Finnish-American architect Eliel Saarinen. Since then, there has always been a bookstore in the same premises.

In 2016, Rahva Raamat store was chosen among the four best bookstores in the world at the London Book Fair. It was also recognized as Estonia's trade act of the year.

In October 2002, Rahva Raamat in Pärnu mnt 10 in Tallinn was in danger of being closed down. Hundreds of protesters appeared on the street, which helped the oldest bookstore in Estonia to stay open.

BaltCap announced in October 2022 that it would buy Rahva Raamat after the permission of the Competition Authority.

References

External links 
 

Bookstores of Estonia